Dimitri Krainc is the Aaron Montgomery Ward Professor and Chairman of the Ken & Ruth Davee Department of Neurology and Director of the Simpson Querrey Center for Neurogenetics at Northwestern University Feinberg School of Medicine. He completed his research and clinical training at the Massachusetts General Hospital and Harvard Medical School, where he served on faculty until relocating to Northwestern in 2013. He was awarded the Javits Neuroscience Investigator Award and outstanding investigator award from NIH, and is an elected Fellow of the American Neurological Association where he also served on the board of directors. Krainc was elected to the Association of American Physicians and the National Academy of Medicine for what NAM described as “groundbreaking discoveries in the area of neurodegenerative disorders." He is the principal founding scientist of biotech companies Lysosomal Therapeutics and Vanqua Bio and serves as Venture Partner at OrbiMed.

Key publications 

 Wong Y.C., Ysselstein, D. and Krainc, D (2018). Mitochondria-lysosome contacts regulate mitochondrial fission via Rab7 hydrolysis. Nature, 15;554(7692):382-386
 Burbulla, L.F., Song, P., Mazzulli, J.R., Zampese, E., Wong, Y.C., Jeon, S., Santos, D.P., Blanz, J., Obermaier, C., Strojny, C., Savas, J., Kiskinis, E., Zhuang, X., Krüger, R., Surmeier, J.D., Krainc, D. (2017) Dopamine oxidation mediates mitochondrial and lysosomal dysfunction in Parkinson's disease. Science, 357(6357):1255-1261
 Burbulla, L., Jeon, S., Zheng, J, Song, P, Silverman, R.B. and Krainc, D.(2019) Direct targeting of wild type glucocerebrosidase improves pathogenic phenotypes in multiple forms of Parkinson’s disease. Science Translational Medicine, 16; 11(514)
 Ysselstein, D., Nguyen, M., Young, T, Severino, A., Schwake, M., Merchant, K., Krainc, D. LRRK2 kinase activity regulates lysosomal glucocerebrosidase in Parkinson’s Disease pathogenesis. Nature Communications, 2019
 Jeong, H., Cohen, D.E., Cui, L., Supinski, A., Bordone, L., Guarente, L.P., and Krainc, D. (2011) Sirt1 mediates neuroprotection from mutant huntingtin by activation of TORC1 and CREB transcriptional pathway. Nature Medicine, 18(1):159-65.
 Mazzulli, J.R., Sun, Y., Knight, A.L., McLean, P.J., Caldwell, G, Sidransky, E, Grabowski, G.A. and Krainc, D. (2011) Gaucher disease glucocerebrosidase and alpha-synuclein form a bidirectional pathogenic loop in synucleinopathies. Cell, 146(1):37-52.
 Jeong H., Then F., Mazzulli JR., Melia, T. Savas J., Voisine C., Tanese, N., Hart C.A., Yamamoto A. and Krainc D. (2009) Acetylation targets mutant huntingtin to autophagosomes for degradation. Cell, 137(1):60-72.
 Cui L., Jeong H., Borovecki F. Parkhurst C., Tanese, N. and Krainc D. (2006) Transcriptional Repression of PGC-1alpha by Mutant Huntingtin Leads to Mitochondrial Dysfunction and Neurodegeneration. Cell, 126, 59-69.
 Zhai, Jeong H., Cui L, Krainc D, and Tjian R. (2005). In vitro Analysis of Huntingtin Mediated Transcriptional Repression Reveals Novel Target and Mechanism, Cell, 123, 1241-53.
 Dunah A.W., Jeong H., Griffin A., Kim M.J., Standaert D.G., Hersch S.M., Mouradian M.M., Young A.B., Tanese N., and Krainc D.(2002) Sp1 and TAF130 transcriptional activity disrupted in early Huntington’s Disease. Science, 296(5576):2238-43.

References 

Year of birth missing (living people)
Living people
American neurologists
Harvard Medical School alumni
Northwestern University faculty